Trichaetoides albiplaga is a moth in the family Erebidae. It was described by Francis Walker in 1862. It is found on Borneo, Peninsular Malaysia and in Thailand. The habitat consists of both lowland and mountainous areas.

References

Moths described in 1862
Syntomini